Gacki is a village in the administrative district of Gmina Rudnik, within Racibórz County, Silesian Voivodeship, in southern Poland.

References

Gacki